Dva Super Dana (English: Two Super Days) is a two-day indie and alternative rock music festival held annually in Sarajevo, Bosnia and Herzegovina. The festival was established in 2016 by the Kriterion Foundation as a platform for the promotion of unsigned indie and alternative rock bands from the Former Yugoslavia. It is held in April in the Kriterion Art Cinema.

History

See also 
 Kriterion Monrovia

References

External links
 Official website

Recurring events established in 2016
April events
Tourist attractions in Sarajevo
Annual events in Bosnia and Herzegovina
Alternative rock festivals
Festivals in Sarajevo
Music festivals in Bosnia and Herzegovina